Avena abyssinica, also known as the Ethiopian oat and "Ajja" by Ethiopians, is a member of the family Poaceae. This grain has long been used in Ethiopia and is well adapted to the high elevations and other conditions there. Still a traditional food plant in Africa, this little-known grain has potential to improve nutrition, boost food security, foster rural development and support sustainable landcare.

References

abyssinica
Crops originating from Ethiopia
 Cereals